Training the Three-Day Event Horse and Rider is a 1995 book written by James C. Wofford, covering each phase of the equestrian sport of eventing, as well as a brief history of the event and a section on choosing a proper horse for the sport. The book ends with a section on conditioning and interval training, and provides several grids for gymnastic jumping. The book is considered a classic by American eventers.

The book is part of the Doubleday Equestrian Library Series (Doubleday, NY). It began printing in 1995, was discontinued, and then began reprinting in 2006.

Chapters
 History and Development of the Three-Day Event
 Selecting and Evaluating the Three-Day Prospect
 Equipment for Horse and Rider
 Dressage
 Cross-Country
 Show Jumping
 Conditioning
 Putting It All Together
 Appendix I: Interval Notation and Conditioning Gallops
 Appendix II: Sample Schedules
 Appendix III: Gymnastic Show Jumping

1995 non-fiction books
Books about sports
Eventing
Doubleday (publisher) books